Park Hill South High School is the second established high school in the Park Hill School District, located on the outskirts of Kansas City, Missouri in Riverside, Missouri, United States.

School history
Park Hill South opened in fall 1998. The first year there was no senior class, as Park Hill South had been split from Park Hill High School and the seniors of 1999 were allowed to remain at Park Hill High School for their last year. The first senior class to graduate from Park Hill South was the class of 2000. The class of 2002 was the first class to complete a 4-year course at Park Hill South.

Athletics
Park Hill South fields team in the following areas: baseball, basketball, cheerleading, cross country, dance, football, golf, soccer, softball, swimming, tennis, track, volleyball, and wrestling,

The Park Hill South coed cheerleading team won the Missouri State Cheerleading Competition in 2002 and 2006.  The Park Hill South swim team has had nine top-20 Missouri state finishes and 11 straight conference wins from 1998 to 2008.

Extracurricular activities
The band, jazz band, orchestra, and choir programs at Park Hill South regularly receive first division (superior) ratings at state, regional, and national contests.  In 2010, the Symphonic Band, under the direction of Dr. Craig Miller, performed at the Missouri Music Educators Association conference at Tan-Tar-A Resort in Osage Beach, Missouri.  In 2011, the A Cappella Choir, under the direction of Elizabeth Brockhoff, and the Symphonic Orchestra, under the direction of Valerie Bell, performed at the same conference.  Also in 2011, the Symphonic Band and Symphonic Orchestra traveled to New York City, New York to perform at the National Band and Orchestra Festival at Carnegie Hall under the conductors Dr Craig Miller and Valerie Bell.  Both groups received first division (superior) ratings. In 2011 Valerie Bell retired and Diane Markley became the new director of the orchestral music program. In January 2013, the Symphonic Orchestra, under the direction of Diane Markley, once again performed at the Missouri Music Educators Association conference. The performance was described as a wonderfully musical performance of an excellent selection of music.

In 2011, the Park Hill South Scholar Bowl team qualified for the Missouri State High School Activities Association state championship tournament.  The Park Hill South Scholar Bowl team was the first Scholar Bowl team from the Park Hill School District to qualify for the state tournament.  The team placed third.  The Scholar Bowl team also qualified to compete in the National Academic Quiz Tournaments High School National Championship, held in Atlanta, Georgia. They finished the first day of competition with a record of four wins and six losses, therefore not qualifying to compete in the second day of competition.

Notable alumni

Sophia Dominguez-Heithoff – Miss Teen USA 2017
 Tommy Hottovy – MLB Pitcher
 Ivo Baltic - OHIO University Basketball
 Jacob Garza - Professional Soccer Player (Foward - 2022-present Kansas City Comets)
 Brendan Allen - Professional Soccer Player (Goalie - 2013-2016 Kansas City Comets)

References
      3. https://www.kcur.org/education/2021-09-22/after-racist-incident-at-park-hill-south-high-school-a-black-parent-calls-for-more-transparency

Educational institutions established in 1998
High schools in Platte County, Missouri
School buildings completed in 1998
Public high schools in Missouri
1998 establishments in Missouri